Kungsör Municipality (Kungsörs kommun) is a municipality in Västmanland County in central Sweden. Its seat is located in the town of Kungsör.

The present municipality was formed in 1971 when Kungsör and Kung Karl (from which Kungsör had been detached as a market town (köping) in 1907) were amalgamated

Kungsör is located at the western end of lake Mälaren. The landscape is open, dominated by fields and meadows.

Localities 
 Kungsör (seat)
 Valskog

Historically, the town grew around the Royal Mansion that King Gustav Vasa had built in the 16th century. Parts of the mansion are still preserved and open for visits. It is located on a cape into the Mälaren.

Riksdag elections

Sister city
 Spydeberg, Norway

References

External links

Kungsör Municipality - Official site

Municipalities of Västmanland County